Podlasie Bug Gorge Landscape Park (Park Krajobrazowy Podlaski Przełom Bugu) is a protected area (Landscape Park) in eastern Poland, established in 1994, covering an area of .

The Park is shared between two voivodeships: Lublin Voivodeship and Masovian Voivodeship. Within Lublin Voivodeship it lies in Biała Podlaska County (Gmina Janów Podlaski, Gmina Konstantynów, Gmina Rokitno, Gmina Terespol). Within Masovian Voivodeship it lies in Łosice County (Gmina Platerów, Gmina Sarnaki).

Within the Landscape Park are four nature reserves.

References 

Podlasie Bug Gorge
Parks in Lublin Voivodeship